Cyril Suk and Pavel Vízner were the defending champions, but did not play together this year.  Suk partnered Robin Vik, losing in the first round.  Vízner partnered Lukáš Dlouhý, losing in the semifinals.

Martin Damm and Leander Paes won the title, defeating Arnaud Clément and Chris Haggard 6–1, 7–6(7–3) in the final.

Seeds

Draw

Draw

External links
Draw

Rosmalen Grass Court Championships
2006 ATP Tour